The 2001–02 Pittsburgh Penguins season was the team's 35th year in the National Hockey League (NHL). The Penguins finished the year with a sub-.500 points percentage and failed to qualify for the playoffs, both for the first time since 1989–90. This was the Penguins' last season with the "flying penguin" logo. They would go back to using their original skating penguin logo the season after.

Off-season
On July 11, 2001, the Penguins shipped star right winger Jaromir Jagr, along with journeyman defenseman Frantisek Kucera, off to play for the Washington Capitals. In return, the Penguins received Kris Beech, Michal Sivek, Ross Lupaschuk, and future considerations.  The New York Rangers also made an offer for Jagr, consisting of Kim Johnsson and Mike York. The Rangers maintain that Patrick traded Jagr to the Capitals because he was angry with their general manager, Glen Sather.  The trade still ranks as the fifth-worst trade in team history.

Regular season
After an 0–4 start, head coach Ivan Hlinka was relieved of his duties and replaced by Rick Kehoe.

Final standings

Schedule and results

|-  style="background:#fcf;"
| 1 || 3 || Colorado Avalanche || 3–1 || Pittsburgh Penguins || Mellon Arena (17,148) || 0–1–0–0 || 0 || 
|-  style="background:#fcf;"
| 2 || 6 || Mighty Ducks of Anaheim || 4–2 || Pittsburgh Penguins || Mellon Arena (15,411) || 0–2–0–0 || 0 || 
|-  style="background:#fcf;"
| 3 || 10 || New York Islanders || 6–3 || Pittsburgh Penguins || Mellon Arena (14,038) || 0–3–0–0 || 0 || 
|-  style="background:#fcf;"
| 4 || 14 || Pittsburgh Penguins || 4–1 || Buffalo Sabres || HSBC Arena (15,815) || 0–4–0–0 || 0 || 
|-  style="background:#cfc;"
| 5 || 16 || Ottawa Senators || 2–5 || Pittsburgh Penguins || Mellon Arena (14,907) || 1–4–0–0 || 2 || 
|-  style="background:#cfc;"
| 6 || 18 || Pittsburgh Penguins || 0–3 || Ottawa Senators || Corel Centre (15,521) || 2–4–0–0 || 4 || 
|-  style="background:#ffc;"
| 7 || 20 || Pittsburgh Penguins || 2–1 OT || St. Louis Blues || Savvis Center (18,854) || 2–4–0–1 || 5 || 
|-  style="background:#cfc;"
| 8 || 23 || Pittsburgh Penguins || 2–4 || Atlanta Thrashers || Philips Arena (13,281) || 3–4–0–1 || 7 || 
|-  style="background:#cfc;"
| 9 || 24 || Dallas Stars || 2–3 || Pittsburgh Penguins || Mellon Arena (16,958) || 4–4–0–1 || 9 || 
|-  style="background:#fcf;"
| 10 || 27 || Pittsburgh Penguins || 4–0 || Toronto Maple Leafs || Air Canada Centre (19,166) || 4–5–0–1 || 9 || 
|-  style="background:#fff;"
| 11 || 28 || Florida Panthers || 2–2 || Pittsburgh Penguins || Mellon Arena (16,449) || 4–5–1–1 || 10 || 
|-  style="background:#fcf;"
| 12 || 31 || Pittsburgh Penguins || 3–0 || Philadelphia Flyers || First Union Center (19,365) || 4–6–1–1 || 10 || 
|-

|-  style="background:#cfc;"
| 13 || 1 || Toronto Maple Leafs || 1–3 || Pittsburgh Penguins || Mellon Arena (14,763) || 5–6–1–1 || 12 || 
|-  style="background:#cfc;"
| 14 || 3 || Tampa Bay Lightning || 1–2 OT || Pittsburgh Penguins || Mellon Arena (17,148) || 6–6–1–1 || 14 || 
|-  style="background:#fff;"
| 15 || 6 || Pittsburgh Penguins || 2–2 || Carolina Hurricanes || Raleigh Entertainment & Sports Arena (15,938) || 6–6–2–1 || 15 || 
|-  style="background:#fcf;"
| 16 || 7 || Pittsburgh Penguins || 2–0 || Florida Panthers || National Car Rental Center (16,164) || 6–7–2–1 || 15 || 
|-  style="background:#ffc;"
| 17 || 10 || Pittsburgh Penguins || 3–2 OT || Tampa Bay Lightning || Ice Palace Arena (18,812) || 6–7–2–2 || 16 || 
|-  style="background:#cfc;"
| 18 || 13 || Pittsburgh Penguins || 1–5 || New Jersey Devils || Continental Airlines Arena (12,480) || 7–7–2–2 || 18 || 
|-  style="background:#fff;"
| 19 || 14 || New York Islanders || 3–3 || Pittsburgh Penguins || Mellon Arena (15,466) || 7–7–3–2 || 19 || 
|-  style="background:#cfc;"
| 20 || 17 || New York Rangers || 0–1 OT || Pittsburgh Penguins || Mellon Arena (17,027) || 8–7–3–2 || 21 || 
|-  style="background:#fcf;"
| 21 || 21 || Vancouver Canucks || 4–1 || Pittsburgh Penguins || Mellon Arena (16,980) || 8–8–3–2 || 21 || 
|-  style="background:#fcf;"
| 22 || 23 || Pittsburgh Penguins || 5–0 || Nashville Predators || Gaylord Entertainment Center (16,717) || 8–9–3–2 || 21 || 
|-  style="background:#cfc;"
| 23 || 24 || Buffalo Sabres || 1–3 || Pittsburgh Penguins || Mellon Arena (16,958) || 9–9–3–2 || 23 || 
|-  style="background:#cfc;"
| 24 || 27 || New Jersey Devils || 0–6 || Pittsburgh Penguins || Mellon Arena (13,410) || 10–9–3–2 || 25 || 
|-  style="background:#fcf;"
| 25 || 29 || Pittsburgh Penguins || 5–0 || San Jose Sharks || Compaq Center (17,496) || 10–10–3–2 || 25 || 
|-

|-  style="background:#fcf;"
| 26 || 1 || Pittsburgh Penguins || 5–2 || Phoenix Coyotes || America West Arena (14,109) || 10–11–3–2 || 25 || 
|-  style="background:#cfc;"
| 27 || 4 || Pittsburgh Penguins || 0–1 || Toronto Maple Leafs || Air Canada Centre (19,271) || 11–11–3–2 || 27 || 
|-  style="background:#cfc;"
| 28 || 6 || Pittsburgh Penguins || 1–4 || Boston Bruins || FleetCenter (14,125) || 12–11–3–2 || 29 || 
|-  style="background:#cfc;"
| 29 || 8 || Atlanta Thrashers || 3–6 || Pittsburgh Penguins || Mellon Arena (14,917) || 13–11–3–2 || 31 || 
|-  style="background:#fff;"
| 30 || 11 || Pittsburgh Penguins || 2–2 || Washington Capitals || MCI Center (18,672) || 13–11–4–2 || 32 || 
|-  style="background:#fcf;"
| 31 || 12 || Boston Bruins || 4–2 || Pittsburgh Penguins || Mellon Arena (13,397) || 13–12–4–2 || 32 || 
|-  style="background:#fcf;"
| 32 || 14 || Minnesota Wild || 5–2 || Pittsburgh Penguins || Mellon Arena (13,378) || 13–13–4–2 || 32 || 
|-  style="background:#fcf;"
| 33 || 16 || Carolina Hurricanes || 7–0 || Pittsburgh Penguins || Mellon Arena (14,226) || 13–14–4–2 || 32 || 
|-  style="background:#fcf;"
| 34 || 19 || Montreal Canadiens || 3–1 || Pittsburgh Penguins || Mellon Arena (17,148) || 13–15–4–2 || 32 || 
|-  style="background:#cfc;"
| 35 || 21 || Washington Capitals || 3–4 || Pittsburgh Penguins || Mellon Arena (17,148) || 14–15–4–2 || 34 || 
|-  style="background:#fff;"
| 36 || 22 || Pittsburgh Penguins || 4–4 || Washington Capitals || MCI Center (18,672) || 14–15–5–2 || 35 || 
|-  style="background:#fcf;"
| 37 || 26 || Pittsburgh Penguins || 4–0 || New Jersey Devils || Continental Airlines Arena (19,040) || 14–16–5–2 || 35 || 
|-  style="background:#fcf;"
| 38 || 29 || Ottawa Senators || 5–2 || Pittsburgh Penguins || Mellon Arena (17,148) || 14–17–5–2 || 35 || 
|-

|-  style="background:#fcf;"
| 39 || 3 || Pittsburgh Penguins || 4–2 || New York Islanders || Nassau Coliseum (16,234) || 14–18–5–2 || 35 || 
|-  style="background:#cfc;"
| 40 || 5 || New York Rangers || 1–4 || Pittsburgh Penguins || Mellon Arena (16,305) || 15–18–5–2 || 37 || 
|-  style="background:#fcf;"
| 41 || 6 || Pittsburgh Penguins || 2–0 || Chicago Blackhawks || United Center (16,537) || 15–19–5–2 || 37 || 
|-  style="background:#fcf;"
| 42 || 8 || Boston Bruins || 3–2 || Pittsburgh Penguins || Mellon Arena (15,897) || 15–20–5–2 || 37 || 
|-  style="background:#cfc;"
| 43 || 10 || Pittsburgh Penguins || 0–2 || Buffalo Sabres || HSBC Arena (16,151) || 16–20–5–2 || 39 || 
|-  style="background:#fcf;"
| 44 || 12 || St. Louis Blues || 4–1 || Pittsburgh Penguins || Mellon Arena (16,958) || 16–21–5–2 || 39 || 
|-  style="background:#fcf;"
| 45 || 15 || Pittsburgh Penguins || 5–2 || Vancouver Canucks || General Motors Place (18,422) || 16–22–5–2 || 39 || 
|-  style="background:#cfc;"
| 46 || 17 || Pittsburgh Penguins || 4–6 || Calgary Flames || Pengrowth Saddledome (15,437) || 17–22–5–2 || 41 || 
|-  style="background:#cfc;"
| 47 || 19 || Pittsburgh Penguins || 0–1 || Edmonton Oilers || Skyreach Centre (16,839) || 18–22–5–2 || 43 || 
|-  style="background:#cfc;"
| 48 || 21 || Philadelphia Flyers || 2–5 || Pittsburgh Penguins || Mellon Arena (16,958) || 19–22–5–2 || 45 || 
|-  style="background:#cfc;"
| 49 || 23 || Tampa Bay Lightning || 1–5 || Pittsburgh Penguins || Mellon Arena (15,127) || 20–22–5–2 || 47 || 
|-  style="background:#cfc;"
| 50 || 24 || Pittsburgh Penguins || 4–5 OT || New York Islanders || Nassau Coliseum (16,234) || 21–22–5–2 || 49 || 
|-  style="background:#cfc;"
| 51 || 26 || Atlanta Thrashers || 2–3 OT || Pittsburgh Penguins || Mellon Arena (17,021) || 22–22–5–2 || 51 || 
|-  style="background:#ffc;"
| 52 || 29 || Pittsburgh Penguins || 3–2 OT || Philadelphia Flyers || First Union Center (19,634) || 22–22–5–3 || 52 || 
|-  style="background:#fcf;"
| 53 || 30 || San Jose Sharks || 6–3 || Pittsburgh Penguins || Mellon Arena (15,152) || 22–23–5–3 || 52 || 
|-

|-  style="background:#fff;"
| 54 || 5 || Pittsburgh Penguins || 3–3 || Carolina Hurricanes || Raleigh Entertainment & Sports Arena (18,730) || 22–23–6–3 || 53 || 
|-  style="background:#fcf;"
| 55 || 7 || Pittsburgh Penguins || 1–0 || Montreal Canadiens || Molson Centre (21,191) || 22–24–6–3 || 53 || 
|-  style="background:#ffc;"
| 56 || 9 || New Jersey Devils || 2–1 OT || Pittsburgh Penguins || Mellon Arena (17,021) || 22–24–6–4 || 54 || 
|-  style="background:#fcf;"
| 57 || 10 || Pittsburgh Penguins || 4–3 || New York Rangers || Madison Square Garden (IV) (18,200) || 22–25–6–4 || 54 || 
|-  style="background:#fcf;"
| 58 || 12 || Pittsburgh Penguins || 5–1 || Ottawa Senators || Corel Centre (17,332) || 22–26–6–4 || 54 || 
|-  style="background:#fcf;"
| 59 || 27 || Los Angeles Kings || 5–4 || Pittsburgh Penguins || Mellon Arena (16,134) || 22–27–6–4 || 54 || 
|-  style="background:#cfc;"
| 60 || 28 || Pittsburgh Penguins || 3–4 OT || Columbus Blue Jackets || Nationwide Arena (18,136) || 23–27–6–4 || 56 || 
|-

|-  style="background:#fcf;"
| 61 || 2 || Detroit Red Wings || 4–2 || Pittsburgh Penguins || Mellon Arena (17,148) || 23–28–6–4 || 56 || 
|-  style="background:#cfc;"
| 62 || 4 || Pittsburgh Penguins || 2–4 || New York Islanders || Nassau Coliseum (13,277) || 24–28–6–4 || 58 || 
|-  style="background:#cfc;"
| 63 || 5 || Florida Panthers || 5–6 OT || Pittsburgh Penguins || Mellon Arena (12,652) || 25–28–6–4 || 60 || 
|-  style="background:#fcf;"
| 64 || 7 || Carolina Hurricanes || 3–1 || Pittsburgh Penguins || Mellon Arena (15,111) || 25–29–6–4 || 60 || 
|-  style="background:#cfc;"
| 65 || 9 || New York Rangers || 2–3 OT || Pittsburgh Penguins || Mellon Arena (16,958) || 26–29–6–4 || 62 || 
|-  style="background:#fcf;"
| 66 || 11 || Columbus Blue Jackets || 4–2 || Pittsburgh Penguins || Mellon Arena (13,422) || 26–30–6–4 || 62 || 
|-  style="background:#fcf;"
| 67 || 13 || Pittsburgh Penguins || 4–2 || Mighty Ducks of Anaheim || Arrowhead Pond of Anaheim (12,536) || 26–31–6–4 || 62 || 
|-  style="background:#fcf;"
| 68 || 16 || Pittsburgh Penguins || 4–3 || Los Angeles Kings || Staples Center (18,118) || 26–32–6–4 || 62 || 
|-  style="background:#cfc;"
| 69 || 18 || Pittsburgh Penguins || 2–4 || Atlanta Thrashers || Philips Arena (12,305) || 27–32–6–4 || 64 || 
|-  style="background:#fcf;"
| 70 || 20 || Phoenix Coyotes || 3–1 || Pittsburgh Penguins || Mellon Arena (12,851) || 27–33–6–4 || 64 || 
|-  style="background:#fff;"
| 71 || 23 || Philadelphia Flyers || 4–4 || Pittsburgh Penguins || Mellon Arena (17,148) || 27–33–7–4 || 65 || 
|-  style="background:#cfc;"
| 72 || 24 || Washington Capitals || 2–6 || Pittsburgh Penguins || Mellon Arena (16,971) || 28–33–7–4 || 67 || 
|-  style="background:#fcf;"
| 73 || 27 || New Jersey Devils || 4–3 || Pittsburgh Penguins || Mellon Arena (15,106) || 28–34–7–4 || 67 || 
|-  style="background:#ffc;"
| 74 || 30 || Pittsburgh Penguins || 2–1 OT || Montreal Canadiens || Molson Centre (21,273) || 28–34–7–5 || 68 || 
|-

|-  style="background:#fcf;"
| 75 || 1 || Montreal Canadiens || 3–0 || Pittsburgh Penguins || Mellon Arena (14,110) || 28–35–7–5 || 68 || 
|-  style="background:#fcf;"
| 76 || 3 || Pittsburgh Penguins || 3–2 || Florida Panthers || National Car Rental Center (15,614) || 28–36–7–5 || 68 || 
|-  style="background:#fcf;"
| 77 || 4 || Pittsburgh Penguins || 4–2 || Tampa Bay Lightning || Amalie Arena (15,454) || 28–37–7–5 || 68 || 
|-  style="background:#fcf;"
| 78 || 6 || Pittsburgh Penguins || 3–1 || Philadelphia Flyers || First Union Center (19,750) || 28–38–7–5 || 68 || 
|-  style="background:#fcf;"
| 79 || 8 || Pittsburgh Penguins || 3–2 || New York Rangers || Madison Square Garden (IV) (18,200) || 28–39–7–5 || 68 || 
|-  style="background:#fff;"
| 80 || 10 || Buffalo Sabres || 4–4 || Pittsburgh Penguins || Mellon Arena (12,724) || 28–39–8–5 || 69 || 
|-  style="background:#fcf;"
| 81 || 12 || Toronto Maple Leafs || 5–2 || Pittsburgh Penguins || Mellon Arena (16,816) || 28–40–8–5 || 69 || 
|-  style="background:#fcf;"
| 82 || 13 || Pittsburgh Penguins || 7–1 || Boston Bruins || FleetCenter (17,565) || 28–41–8–5 || 69 || 
|-

|- style="text-align:center;"
| Legend:       = Win       = Loss       = OT Loss       = Tie

Player statistics

Scoring
 Position abbreviations: C = Center; D = Defense; G = Goaltender; LW = Left Wing; RW = Right Wing
  = Joined team via a transaction (e.g., trade, waivers, signing) during the season. Stats reflect time with the Penguins only.
  = Left team via a transaction (e.g., trade, waivers, release) during the season. Stats reflect time with the Penguins only.

Goaltending

Awards and records

Transactions
The Penguins were involved in the following transactions from June 10, 2001, the day after the deciding game of the 2001 Stanley Cup Finals, through June 13, 2002, the day of the deciding game of the 2002 Stanley Cup Finals.

Trades

Players acquired

Players lost

Signings

Other

Draft picks
The Penguins selected the following players in the 2001 NHL Entry Draft at the National Car Rental Center in Sunrise, Florida: 

Draft notes 
 Compensatory pick received from NHL as compensation for free agent Ron Tugnutt.
 Compensatory pick received from NHL as compensation for free agent Peter Popovic.
 The Pittsburgh Penguins' sixth-round pick went to the Columbus Blue Jackets as the result of a March 13, 2001, trade that sent Frantisek Kucera to the Penguins in exchange for this pick.
 The Pittsburgh Penguins' ninth-round pick went to the New York Islanders as the result of a November 14, 2000, trade that sent Dan Trebil to the Penguins in exchange for this pick.

Farm teams
The American Hockey League's Wilkes-Barre/Scranton Penguins, after losing in the Calder Cup Finals the previous season, finished last overall in the Western Conference with a 20–44–13–3 record.

The ECHL's Wheeling Nailers finished fifth in the Northern Conference's Northwest Division with a 36–32–4 record.  It was their first year under John Brophy.

See also
2001–02 NHL season

Notes

References

Pitts
Pitts
Pittsburgh Penguins seasons
Pitts
Pitts